Nwokorie is a surname. Notable people with the surname include:

 Chukie Nwokorie (born 1975), American football player
 Ivory Nwokorie, Nigerian powerlifter

Surnames of Nigerian origin